The Yale Hunger and Homelessness Action Project (YHHAP) is a 501(c)(3) non-profit organization of university students working on housing and food security issues in New Haven, CT. Founded in 1974 by undergraduates of Yale College and then-Yale chaplain William Sloane Coffin, the organization is run by an all-student executive board and is a member of Dwight Hall. YHHAP operates a collection of volunteer projects, primarily in food rescue, shelter aid, case management, and youth mentoring. Under the national VITA program, YHHAP is one of the largest providers of free tax preparation services in Connecticut. The organization also publishes the New Haven street journal The Elm City Echo and hosts the biannual YHHAP Fast on Yale's campus. As of 2017, YHHAP had 250 active members, making the group one of the largest at Yale. The current board is led by Luis Guevara-Flores and Kaci Xie. Kadidia Sylla, Arushi Dogra, Joanna Chen and Kristen Meola also serve on the 2022 board.

References 

1974 establishments in Connecticut
Non-profit organizations based in Connecticut
Yale University
501(c)(3) organizations
Homelessness in the United States